Senator Banks may refer to:

A. Bleecker Banks (1835–1910), New York State Senate
J. B. Banks (died 2003), Missouri State Senate
Jim Banks (born 1979), Indiana State Senate
Nathaniel P. Banks (1816–1894), Massachusetts State Senate